MTA International (or MTA), is a globally-broadcasting, nonprofit satellite television network and a division of Al-Shirkatul Islamiyyah which began in 1992 and was established in 1994 and launched the world's first Islamic TV channel to broadcast globally. It consists of nine international channels that are run and funded entirely from donations by the members of the Ahmadiyya Muslim Community.

History

Initial Launch
MTA, becoming the first TV channel to broadcast Islamic programmes globally, was established by Mirza Tahir Ahmad, then-Caliph of the Ahmadiyya Muslim Community. MTA's first channel was launched on 31 January 1992, broadcasting the weekly Friday Sermon. Later, on 7 January 1994, AMP was rebranded to MTA and increased its daily broadcasting hours from four to 12 hours, and later, in April 1996, to 24. Initially, the studio and video library shared a  room in the Mahmood Hall of Fazl Mosque equipped with a single video camera and "few ordinary flood lights".

EPG Guide 
In April 2001, MTA International began its EPG when the channel launched on the Sky UK platform as a free-to-air channel.

MTA Africa Launch 
On 1 August 2016, MTA Africa 1 and 2 were inaugurated by the current caliph, Mirza Masroor Ahmad broadcasting programmes in African languages as well as programs from MTA 1.

2020 Era 
From 27 May 2020, known as Khilafat Day for Ahmadis, MTA International rearranged its channels according to regions and introduced new channels. These new channels were formerly MTA1 broadcasting on different satellites, converted to cater viewers of specific regions by broadcasting programmes in specific languages for each region. For Instance, MTA 1 on Galaxy 19 became MTA8 HD AMERICA with programmes in Urdu, English, French and Spanish.

Channels 
Currently, the MTA International network runs 10 channels 24/7:

Worldwide
 MTA1 World was the first channel launched by the MTA network and is the primary channel broadcasting programmes in English, Urdu and occasionally archived programmes in Arabic and French, and has multiple audio tracks to provide translations for certain programmes such as the Friday Sermon. Its broadcast coverage used to cover the entire globe before MTA1 on some satellites were converted into regional channels. Now, it is mainly broadcast in the UK/Europe and parts of South America, as well as being broadcast on terrestrial TV in Suriname.

Europe & MENA
 MTA2 Europe focuses on programmes aimed specifically at European and Middle Eastern viewers by broadcasting programmes in a range of European Languages, commonly French and German, in addition to English and Urdu, some of which are also broadcast on MTA1. MTA2, too, also has a range of audio tracks used for translations, similar to MTA1, except on MTA2 the Bengali Track is sometimes switched with Spanish. It is also broadcast in HD on the HotBird 13C and streamed online.
 MTA3 Al-Arabia is an all-Arabic channel launched in March 2007 specifically for Arabic viewers in the Middle East and North Africa, however, is also broadcast in other parts of the world such as Europe, Indonesia and North America (where it is broadcast in HD). Initially, it was broadcast on the Egyptian-owned Nilesat 201 before being barred and eventually being broadcast on the European Eutelsat 7 West A instead, in 2008.

Africa
MTA Africa-based content is typically produced in the various African studios, such as the Wahab Adam Studios, based in Ghana. There are 4 African channels as part of the MTA International network:
MTA4 Africa (formerly known as MTA Africa 1) is the fourth satellite-based television channel of the MTA International network. It was launched in early August 2016, broadcasting specifically for viewers of Sub-Saharan Africa. The channel is broadcast on the Astra 2F, and is also broadcast on terrestrial TV in Belize. Programmes aired are usually in English, French or Swahili language.
 MTA5 Africa is a sister channel to MTA4, launched alongside it, and is primarily for the viewers of West Africa and airs programmes in a number of African languages, notably Hausa, Krio, Twi and Yoruba. It is the former MTA Africa 2 channel.

 MTA Gambia
 MTA Ghana is a terrestrial channel and the first country-exclusive channel part of the MTA network which aims to air programmes specifically for Ghanaian viewers, and broadcasts programmes in local languages.

Asia
 MTA6 Asia broadcasts programs which are specific to Pakistan (and by extension South Asia) as well Indonesia, for example, specific language services as well travel documentaries. It airs programmes in Urdu, English and Indonesian language, with some programs carrying additional translations in other languages, like Bengali.
 MTA7 Asia primarily caters to the viewers of the Indian subcontinent, as it airs programs specific to the region. The channel also provides translations and content in local languages such as Bengali, Malayalam and Tamil.

Americas
 MTA8 America is a channel that is broadcast in the North-American subcontinent, with content broadcast in English and Urdu as well French and Spanish. Due to the time difference between American timings and GMT, MTA in the Americas also has MTA+3 which is essentially MTA8 with a 3-hour delay.

Members 
The majority of its workers are volunteers with just a small percentage of paid full-time staff. Out of the 300 staff members that work in MTA's London offices, 90% are volunteers who dedicate their time to assist in the running of the network.

Online Media Services

MTA has introduced a number of apps for the benefit of their viewers across a variety of platforms on all devices such as TV, Phone, Tablets, Desktops etc. The network also makes use of social media to live stream their channels on websites such as Facebook and Twitter as well as YouTube to broadcast all four channels, live.

In addition, as MTA International operates globally and in many different countries, many countries (where Ahmadiyya may have a significant or even minor presence) have their own official MTA YouTube channel for their specific region or language, which allows them to stream regional events that may not be broadcast on MTA but may be streamed on YouTube such as Jalsa Salana Canada was streamed on the YouTube channel MTA Canada, as well as this, it allows specific countries to stream live translations for key programmes such as the Friday Sermon.

There are also applications for mobile and personal devices on a variety of platform such as Roku TV, Apple TV, Android and iOS. On 2 August (at Jalsa Salana UK 2019), a range of MTA applications were launched for Smart TV brands such as Samsung, Android TV, Amazon Fire TV, Panasonic, LG, Sony and Philips.

National Studios 
In most countries throughout the world in which there is a presence of the Ahmadiyya Community there is often a national MTA Studio. For example, MTA International USA Studios, MTA International Canada Studios, MTA International German Studios, MTA International Nigeria Studios, MTA International Ghana Studios, MTA International UK Studios etc. The primary and main MTA Studios is based in London, MTA International Studios.

The headquarters and UK studios of MTA International were located at Fazl Mosque, London when it was launched and are now located inside two larger studios built within the site of the Baitul Futuh Mosque Complex in South London, United Kingdom.

Photos

References 

 Khan, M. (2003). Muslim Television Ahmadiyya. Retrieved 28 March 2014, from http://www.alislam.org/library/periodicals/tariq-uk/chapter6.pdf

Muslim Television Ahmadiyya International
Islamic television networks
Islam in the United Kingdom
Television channels and stations established in 1994